Cyrinda Foxe (born Kathleen Victoria Hetzekian; February 22, 1952 – September 7, 2002) was an American actress, model and publicist, best known for her role in Andy Warhol's Bad (1977). She was married to both David Johansen of the proto-punk band New York Dolls and Steven Tyler of the hard rock band Aerosmith. She is the mother of Mia Tyler.

Early life
Foxe was born Kathleen Victoria Hetzekian in Santa Monica, California, to an Armenian family. She grew up as an army brat in an abusive household. After graduating high school, she lived in Texas briefly before settling in New York City, where she got a job working as an assistant to Greta Garbo. She later changed her name and began frequenting Max's Kansas City, a popular Manhattan nightclub, and appeared in Andy Warhol's film Andy Warhol's Bad (1977).

Career
Foxe had relationships with David Bowie and James Williamson of The Stooges while working under Tony Defries as a publicist for MainMan, Bowie's management company. She also appeared in the music video for Bowie's 1973 single, "The Jean Genie".  Bowie wanted the video to depict "Ziggy as a kind of Hollywood street-rat" with a "consort of the Marilyn brand". This led to Foxe's casting, and she flew from New York to San Francisco especially for the shoot. Bowie said of the song "I wrote it for her amusement in her apartment. Sexy girl." Foxe records in her memoir that Bowie said to her "I want to write you a song. What do you want?", to which Foxe replied "something like the Yardbirds". Foxe in later years maintained a fondness for Bowie referring to him as a "great lover" and stating that she "really cherish[ed her] time" with Bowie.

In his memoir, Arthur Kane characterized Foxe as being "bright [and] very magnetic" and having "an effervescence about her" as "[she was] very much a character of her own creation."

Having grown up idolizing the Rolling Stones, Foxe became closely associated with the New York Dolls. In 1977, after years of dating, she married David Johansen, the band's lead singer. It was while Foxe was married to Johansen that she met Aerosmith's lead singer, Steven Tyler.

After less than a year of marriage to Johansen, Foxe left him for Steven Tyler. Foxe and Tyler married and had a daughter, Mia, but the marriage was troubled by drug addiction, extramarital affairs, and physical and emotional abuse. Foxe and Tyler divorced shortly before Aerosmith made a comeback in the late 1980s. She raised Mia in Sunapee, New Hampshire, and New York City.

Personal life
In 1997, Foxe's memoir, Dream On: Livin' on the Edge with Steven Tyler and Aerosmith, co-written with Danny Fields, was published. Not long after the book was released, Foxe announced that the paperback edition of Dream On would include nude photos of Steven Tyler, but Tyler won a lawsuit in 1999, preventing Foxe from publishing the photos. In 2000, she launched a web site in which she was selling nude pictures of Tyler, but the site closed by the end of the year.

Death

In 2001, Foxe had a mild stroke. She received Medicaid and food stamps, but she had no apartment or place to live. Myra Freidman organized a benefit at CBGB to raise money for Foxe. Steven Tyler, who also paid her hospital bills, donated a signed Aerosmith guitar to the benefit, which sold for $5000. David Bowie also donated an acoustic guitar. Tyler agreed to pay for a room for Foxe at the Gramercy Park Hotel where, on August 28, 2002, she married musician Keith Waa.

Foxe died at age 50 from an inoperable brain tumor on September 7, 2002.

References

External links
 
 Mary Anne Christiano.  Interview Punk magazine.

1952 births
2002 deaths
20th-century American actresses
Actresses from Santa Monica, California
Actresses from California
American film actresses
20th-century American memoirists
American people of Armenian descent
Deaths from brain cancer in the United States
Female models from California
Female models from New York (state)
Models from New York City
People associated with The Factory
People from Sunapee, New Hampshire